171P/Spahr is a periodic comet in the Solar System. 171P/Spahr  was recovered on 20–24 October 2011 at apparent magnitude 20.6 using the  Faulkes Telescope South. 171P/Spahr is peaked at about magnitude 18 in 2012.

During the 1999 passage the comet brightened to about magnitude 13.5.

At perihelion on January 13, 2019 when the comet was 1AU from Earth, the 3-sigma uncertainty in the comet's Earth distance was ±500 km.

References

External links 
 Orbital simulation from JPL (Java) / Horizons Ephemeris
 171P/Spahr – Seiichi Yoshida @ aerith.net
 Elements and Ephemeris for 171P/Spahr – Minor Planet Center
 Discovery and Historical Highlights at Gary W. Kronk's Cometography

Periodic comets
0171
Comets in 2019